Sclopetaspidina is a subtribe of armored scale insects.  It was not confirmed by Takagi's 2002 study.

Genera
Artemisaspis
Balaspis
Contigaspis
Gadaspis
Paragadaspis
Sclopetaspis

References

Insect subtribes
Diaspidini